The Meitei language festival, formally known as the Manipuri language festival or the Manipuri Bhasha Utsav, is an annual language festival that is dedicated to the active promotion and the development of Meitei language (officially called Manipuri language), indigenous Meitei script and Meitei culture in the People's Republic of Bangladesh. The event is organised by the Bangladesh Manipuri Sahitya Sangsad.

Written tests 
Every year, written tests are organised for the students in the Meitei language festival. 
 For the students of the 1st grade to the 8th grade, they shall appear the test in "A branch".
 For the students of the 9th grade and the 10th grade, they shall appear the test in "B branch".

2022 event 
In 2022, AK Sheram, the president of the Bangladesh Manipuri Sahitya Sangsad, and Shahena Begum, the then acting principal of Teteigaon Ramid Uddin High School, inaugurated the Meitei language festival, followed by a colorful procession, participated by the students and guests belonging to the Meitei ethnicity (Manipuri people), including the Meitei Muslims (Meitei Pangals), and then paying tributes to the Shaheed Minar of the school for their language martyrs.

The students had the opportunity to appear a written test in their mother tongue Meitei language in the indigenous Meitei script. During the event, a meeting was organised on the practice and promotion of Meitei language and culture in the school auditorium, followed by the prize distribution ceremonies and the cultural programs. 

The meeting was participated by Professor Saurabh Sikdar of Linguistics Department of Dhaka University, Executive Director of Jabarang Kalyan Samiti Mathura Vikas Tripura and member secretary and development worker of International Tribal Language Decade National Committee Bandhan Arang.

2023 event 
In 2023, the festival was organised in Adampur Tetaigaon Rashid Uddin High School premises in Kamalganj, Moulvibazar. During the event, the national flag of Bangladesh and the flag of the organization were hoisted, followed by a colorful rally, starting from the school premises, patrolling around the main road of the Adampur Bazar. 
In the event, a written test of Meitei language was organised, which was participated by more than 150 students from 1st to 10th grades of classes. 
A meeting, including cultural programs and prize distribution ceremonies, were organised in the auditorium of the Tetigaon Rashid Uddin High School. It was chaired by a renowned poet and essayist AK Sheram and the organization's general secretary Nambram Shankar. 
Parimal Singh, the secretary of the National Sports Council of Bangladesh, was the chief guest of the event.

Delegates and diasporas from other nations

India 
 N Ratan Meitei from Manipur state of India was the special guest in the 2023 Meitei language festival.

Canada 
 Natasha, a Canadian expatriate and a Meitei language researcher, also attended the 2023 Meitei language festival.

Published works 
 “Meira”, the cover of commemorative collection of the festival was released in the 2023 Meitei language festival.

See also 
 Meitei language movements
 Meitei classical language movement
 Meitei associate official language movement
 Meitei linguistic purism movement
 Directorate of Language Planning and Implementation
 Sahitya Akademi
 List of Sahitya Akademi Award winners for Meitei
 List of Sahitya Akademi Translation Prize winners for Meitei
 List of Yuva Puraskar winners for Meitei
 Manipuri Sahitya Parishad
 Manipur University
 Manipur University of Culture

Notes

References

External links 

Meitei language
Annual events
Events in Bangladesh
Language festivals
Meitei culture
Meitei festivals
Meitei script